SR58 may refer to:
SR58 (battery)
SR58 (highway)